Roanoke Catholic School is a private, Roman Catholic K-12 school in Roanoke, Virginia, United States.

Demographics
The demographic breakdown of the 456 K-12 students enrolled for 2017-18 was:
Asian - 7.9%
Black - 3.7%
Hispanic - 13.6%
White - 71.7%
Multiracial - 3.1%

References

External links

Roman Catholic Diocese of Richmond
Catholic schools in Virginia
Catholic secondary schools in Virginia
Schools in Roanoke, Virginia
Educational institutions established in 1889
Private K-12 schools in Virginia
1889 establishments in Virginia